The Austria men's national basketball team represents Austria in international basketball competition. The team is controlled and organised by Basketball Austria.

Austria has competed at the EuroBasket six times throughout their history. Their best performance overall came at the 1951 tournament. However, the team is still seeking qualification to their first appearance on to the global stage at the FIBA World Cup.

History

EuroBasket 1947
Austria first competed in the European Basketball Championship at EuroBasket 1947, placing 12th of 14 teams. Initially, the team struggled and lost both of their preliminary round matches, along with their first semifinal round match. Then they defeated Albania to place second in the group and set up a match against the Netherlands for 11th and 12th place, which Austria lost after a long battle.

EuroBasket 1951
Austria made their second appearance on the continental stage at EuroBasket 1951 in Paris. The national team was eliminated from championship contention after finishing 1–3 in pool play and fourth in their group. They won all three of their first round classification games, however, advancing to the 9th–12th place classification semifinals. A loss to the Netherlands, but a win over West Germany propelled Austria into 11th place of the 18 teams in the tournament.

EuroBasket 1955
Austria's appearance at EuroBasket 1955 in Budapest began with a 2–2 showing in preliminary round play. This was good enough for third place in the pool, and Austria was pushed to classification play.  There, they were able to win only 1 out of 4 games (the win coming against West Germany), placing fourth of the five teams in the group. Playing against Luxembourg and then Switzerland in classification for the 13th–16th place playoffs, Austria won both games to finish 13th of the 18 teams.

EuroBasket 1957
In Sofia for the EuroBasket 1957 competition, Austria was defeated three times in the preliminary round. Their 0–3 record put them last in their group and sent them to the classification pool. The team won two games there, finishing at a record of 2–5 to take an overall 14th place in the 16 team tournament.

Later years
Austria went on to qualify to the EuroBasket two more times in 1959 and 1977. But since then it has been a struggle for the national team to qualify for major international basketball tournaments.

Competitive record

FIBA World Cup

Olympic Games

Championship for Small Countries

EuroBasket

Recent and forthcoming fixtures

2021

2022

2023

Team

Current roster
Roster for the EuroBasket 2025 Pre-Qualifiers matches on 23 and 26 February 2023 against Poland and Croatia.

Depth chart

Head coaches

Notable players
Jakob Pöltl – First Austrian-born player to get drafted and play in the NBA.

Past rosters
1947 EuroBasket: finished 12th among 14 teams

3 Frankl, 4 Hans Bohman, 5 Eder, 6 Ganglberger, 7 Franz Gluck, 8 Herbert Haselbacher, 9 Paulin, 10 Konrad Pitsch, 12 Helmut Schmidt, 13 Richard Pollak, 15 Otto Schreiweiss, 16 Vostatek, 17 Hans Zsak, 29 Walter Ledl (Coach: ?)

1951 EuroBasket: finished 11th among 17 teams

3 Hans Zsak, 5 Gerhard Puschner, 6 Peter Vecernik, 7 Richard Pollak, 8 Herbert Haselbacher, 10 Walter Ledl, 13 Felix Schober, 15 Franz Gluck, 16 Hans Bohman, 17 Benno Binder, 18 Ewald Polansky, 19 Hans Praschl (Coach: Miodrag Stefanović)

1955 EuroBasket: finished 13th among 18 teams

3 Gunter Brousek, 4 Karl Hackl, 5 Franz Gebhard, 6 Oskar Doppes, 7 Ewald Polansky, 8 Helmut Schmidt, 9 Karl Thiering, 10 Helmut Schurer, 11 Baczinsky, 12 Johann Karall, 13 Karl Machek, 14 Peter Vecernik, 15 Karl Privoznik, 17 Alfred Probst (Coach: Janos Gerdov)

1957 EuroBasket: finished 14th among 16 teams

3 Nikolaus Waldingbrett, 4 Gunter Brousek, 5 Johann Karall, 6 Friedrich Walz, 7 Ewald Polansky, 8 Herwig Schon, 9 Werner Grohs, 10 Karl Thiering, 11 Alfred Waschkau, 12 Helmut Schurer, 14 Franz Vranitzky, 15 Alfred Probst (Coach: Herbert Haselbacher)

1959 EuroBasket: finished 16th among 17 teams

3 Friedrich Walz, 4 Peter Kotas, 5 Franz Havlicek, 6 Oskar Doppes, 7 Ewald Polansky, 8 Herwig Schon, 9 Walter Ledl, 10 Karl Thiering, 11 Alfred Probst, 12 Heinz Vybiral, 13 Ernst Tutschek, 15 Karl Privoznik (Coach: Herbert Haselbacher)

1977 EuroBasket: finished 12th among 12 teams

4 Wolfgang Vlk, 5 Friedrich Miklas, 6 Bernhard Slavicek, 7 Peter Bilik, 8 Peter Poiger, 9 Herbert Watzke, 10 Erich Tecka, 11 Werner Meisinger, 12 Helmut Zimmel, 13 Walter Fuchs, 14 Peter Wolf, 15 Herbert Haselbacher (Coach: Jan Hluchy)

Kit

Manufacturer
2015–2017: Spalding

Sponsor
2015–2017: Admiral (Sportwetten)

See also

Sport in Austria
Austria women's national basketball team
Austria men's national under-20 basketball team
Austria men's national under-18 basketball team
Austria men's national under-16 basketball team

Notes

References

External links

Official website 
Austria FIBA profile
Austria National Team – Men at Eurobasket.com
Austria Basketball Records at FIBA Archive

Videos
Great Britain v Austria - Full Game - EuroBasket 2022 Pre-Qualifiers Youtube.com video

Austria national basketball team
1934 establishments in Austria